David Louis Walker (born 13 November 1938) is a retired Australian bishop of the Roman Catholic Church.  He was ordained bishop of the Roman Catholic Diocese of Broken Bay on 3 September 1996, succeeding the diocese's inaugural bishop, the Most Reverend Patrick Murphy. His retirement was effective from 13 November 2013, his seventy-fifth birthday.

Early years
David Louis Walker spent his childhood in the Sydney suburb of Clovelly until he began seminary training in 1956. His early years in the priesthood were spent teaching theology at St Patrick's College, Manly and at the Catholic Theological Faculty of Sydney.

Walker was director of the Educational Centre for Christian Spirituality which he established in Randwick in 1978 until his appointment as bishop.

Views
Although he has stated that when he was ordained bishop he was a "centrist", Walker is regarded by many Australian Catholics as a progressive bishop owing to his support for lay ministries, laicised priests and "socially progressive" attitudes. He attributes his perceived shift to the left as a consequence of the shift of the Australian Episcopal Conference to the right. He maintains that he has remained in the centre. He has been quoted as saying "when I was made Bishop, I was perceived as being in the centre of ecclesiastical politics. Ten years later I am perceived as being on the left. My views haven't changed."

Activities
Walker is committed to promoting a truly Australian spirituality, fostering theological and spiritual education through an experiential understanding of the personal faith journey. He brings to his appointment a continuing commitment to faith renewal and to be responsive to the changing needs of the Catholic Church in Australia. He is involved in the cause for the beatification of Eileen O'Connor, the co-founder of Our Lady's Nurses for the Poor (the Brown Nurses).

Walker is a prominent speaker and has published extensively on faith renewal, spirituality, mysticism, formation of clergy and church leadership. He is a former member of the Ecumenical Commission of the Archdiocese of Sydney, the New South Wales Ecumenical Council, the Australian Catholic Theological Association and the Committee for the Continuing Education of the Clergy. He was a board member of the Australasian Catholic Record and a former consultant to the National Council of Churches.

In 2005, Walker travelled to Rome as the representative of the Australian Catholic Bishops Conference for the International Congress organised to commemorate the 40th anniversary of the Dogmatic Constitution on Divine Revelation ("Dei Verbum").

External links
Diocese of Broken Bay website
New full-time ministry for women in the diocese of Broken Bay

Living people
Roman Catholic bishops of Broken Bay
Clergy from Sydney
1938 births
20th-century Roman Catholic bishops in Australia
21st-century Roman Catholic bishops in Australia